Peritropha oligodrachma is a species of moth of the family Oecophoridae. It is found in most of Australia.

The wingspan is about 20 mm.

The larvae live in a tunnel on the underside of a leaf of its food plant. It feeds on the leaves of various Eucalyptus species.

References

Hypertrophinae
Moths of Australia
Moths described in 1954